Gun dogs, or bird dogs, are types of hunting dogs developed to assist hunters in finding and retrieving game, usually  quail, dove, or duck. Gun dogs are divided into three primary types: retrievers, flushing dogs, and pointing breeds.

Types 
There are several types of gundogs, each type consisting of multiple breeds. Gun dogs are divided into three primary types: retrievers, flushing dogs, and pointing breeds.

Method of work 
Although classified according to method of work, gun dogs often have skills extending beyond the tasks outlined for their classification.  Depending upon how they are trained, dogs may be useful in a variety of hunting situations. The methods described here are analogous to human-canine hunting going back tens of thousands of years.

Pointers and setters 

Upon reaching the field, the handler often will cast or direct the dog in a wide circle.  Experienced dogs will search the edges of the field knowing that birds are usually found there.  This wide run helps to burn off the dog's initial exuberance and may help the dog establish its bearings and form a "background" upon which game smells will be processed.  The dog then begins working back and forth, starting near the hunter and slowly ranging out.  The dog repeats this process as the hunters move through the field.  How far a handler allows the dog to range is a matter of personal preference.  When a pair of dogs work as a team, one works close in while the other ranges out in larger circles.  If either dog becomes birdy, the other dog works its way over to assist.  Good bird dogs are alert to their handlers and to the disposition of other dogs in the field.  They should readily comply if the handler casts them to an area of particular interest, such as a brush pile.

When game is detected, a dog freezes, either pointing or crouching.  If other dogs are present, they also freeze, "honoring" the first dog's point.  The pointing dog remains motionless until the hunters are in position.  Handlers give the command whoa, instructing the dog to remain still.  What happens next depends on the dog's training.  Some trainers train the dog to stay motionless while the hunter steps forward and flushes the game.  Other trainers direct the dog to flush the game with a command such as get it!  Pointing dogs excel on covey type birds such as bobwhite, quail, and grouse as these birds will hold in position well, allowing the hunter to approach and get into position.

If a bird is downed, the dogs are instructed to search for and retrieve it with the command dead bird, or simply dead.

Flushing dogs 

When hunting upland game, flushing dogs (spaniels and retrievers) work much more closely with the hunter.  Flushers will not cover the same amount of ground as a pointing dog as the flusher must be kept within shotgun distance.  Flushing dogs are often used on birds that run from the hunter.  On such birds as pheasant, an aggressive flush is necessary to spring the bird to wing.  Flushing dogs excel on these types of bird because they do not point the birds, giving them little time for escape on the ground.  Pointing breeds are used on such birds, but must be well trained to know when the bird pointed has moved.

Once a bird has been flushed, the dog will sit or "hup" to watch the flight of the bird and mark the fallen birds for retrieval.  A dog which does this successfully is referred to as "steady to wing and shot".  Steadiness is the hallmark of the finished spaniel.

When a bird is shot, the dog should mark where it fell and wait until given the command to retrieve.  Once commanded, the dog will race to the point of fall, pick up the bird, and return it to the handler.

Retrievers 

Retrievers are typically used when waterfowl hunting, although they can also be employed in hunting upland birds as well. Since a majority of waterfowl hunting employs the use of small boats in winter conditions, retrievers are expected to remain sitting calmly and quietly until sent to retrieve. As birds move into range, a well-trained retriever will watch and follow the handler's gun as he shoots, marking, and remembering each bird that is downed. This is called "marking off the gun", and the downed birds are called "marks". Once the shooting has ceased, the handler commands the dog to retrieve each bird that has been downed. If a dog did not see the bird fall, a retriever takes direction from the handler, who can use hand and whistle signals to guide the dog to the unseen downed bird. This is called a "blind" retrieve. During a typical day of shooting, additional birds are frequently downed while the dog is performing a retrieve. Retrievers are taught to ignore these "diversions" until the current retrieve has been completed. Also at times multiple dogs are used on a hunt, and retrievers are also taught to "honor" another dog's retrieve by remaining calm and quiet while the other dog is working.

List of gundog breeds 

Barbet
Bracco Italiano
Braque du Bourbonnais
Brittany
Burgos Pointer
Drentsche Patrijshond
Cesky Fousek
Corded Poodle
German Longhaired Pointer
German Shorthaired Pointer
German Spaniel
German Wirehaired Pointer
Hungarian Wirehaired Vizsla
Kooikerhondje
Lagotto Romagnolo
Large Münsterländer
Pointer
Portuguese Water Dog
Portuguese Pointer
Pudelpointer
Chesapeake Bay Retriever
Curly Coated Retriever
Flat-Coated Retriever
Golden Retriever
Labrador Retriever
Nova Scotia Duck Tolling Retriever
English Setter
Gordon Setter
Irish Setter
Irish Red and White Setter
Small Münsterländer
American Cocker Spaniel
American Water Spaniel
Boykin Spaniel
Clumber Spaniel
English Cocker Spaniel
English Springer Spaniel
Field Spaniel
Irish Water Spaniel
Sussex Spaniel
Welsh Springer Spaniel
Spanish Water Dog
Spinone Italiano
Stichelhaar
Standard Poodle
Vizsla
Weimaraner
Wirehaired Pointing Griffon
Wirehaired Vizsla

Kennel club classification
When competing in conformation shows most kennel clubs, including The Kennel Club group pedigree gun dog breeds together in their own gun dog group, whilst some such as the American Kennel Club group them in a sporting group.

See also 
Field trial

References

 
Dog types
Hunting dogs

de:Schießhund